The following is a list of songs written about Madras State, an ancient state of India till 1968:

"Madras Nalla Madras" - a 1967 Tamil sing composed by M. S. Viswanathan
"Nadras A Suthi Paka Poren" - a 1994 Tamil song composed by A. R. Rahman
"Vanakam Vazha Veikum Chennai" - a 2012 song from the film Vanakkam Chennai
"Enga Ooru Madras" - a 2014 Tamil song composed by Santosh Narayanan
"Porambokku Paadal" - a classical song
"The Madras Song - a 2014 Tamil song by Murugappa Group in celebration of 375 years of Madras State.

References

Madras
Songs about India